Meurig Bowen is a British arts administrator who works mainly in festival and orchestral programming. He is the Chief Executive and Artistic Director of the Britten Sinfonia and a Trustee of Polyphony (choir).

He is the younger son of Welsh tenor Kenneth Bowen (1932–2018) and brother of Hereford Cathedral Director of Music Geraint Bowen.

Bowen was educated at William Ellis School, London, and King's College, Cambridge, where he was a choral scholar (1985–88). Six years at a London artist management company, where he was Administrator of The Hilliard Ensemble, were followed by a further six years working in Sydney as artistic administrator of the Australian Chamber Orchestra. He returned to the UK as director of the Lichfield Festival, and subsequently head of programming at the Aldeburgh Festival, before becoming Artistic Director of the Cheltenham Music Festival, where he succeeded Martyn Brabbins, in 2007.

Bowen stepped down from his role at the Cheltenham Music Festival in December 2017 to take up the new role of Head of Artistic Planning at BBC National Orchestra and Chorus of Wales.

In April 2017, Quarto Books published The School of Music, a children’s book he co-wrote with his wife Rachel, and illustrated by Daniel Frost. The English language edition has been followed in 2018 by translations available in Brazil, Bulgaria, China, France, Korea and Russia.

In August 2020, Bowen was appointed as Chief Executive and Artistic Director of the Britten Sinfonia, a chamber orchestra based in Cambridge.

At times, Bowen has been active as a music journalist and commentator, writing for the national press and for CD liner notes, notably on the Hyperion label.

Bowen’s two-hander for actor and pianist, Erik Satie: Memoirs of a Pear-Shaped Life, was premiered at the 2015 Cheltenham Music Festival, and has since been performed at the Presteigne and Canterbury Festivals, St George’s Bristol, in Oxford and New York.

Notes

External links
 https://web.archive.org/web/20100207165520/http://cheltenhamfestivals.com/blog/tag/meurig-bowen/
 

1965 births
Living people
Artistic directors (music)
Alumni of King's College, Cambridge
People educated at William Ellis School